Rábagyarmat is a village in , Hungary.

References

Populated places in Vas County